Chabařovice is a town in Ústí nad Labem District in the Ústí nad Labem Region of the Czech Republic. It has about 2,500 inhabitants. The historic town centre is well preserved and is protected by law as an urban monument zone.

Administrative parts
The village of Roudníky is an administrative part of Chabařovice.

Geography
Chabařovice is located west of Ústí nad Labem, in its immediate vicinity. It lies in the eastern tip of the Most Basin lowland. The municipal territory is rich in ponds, supplied mostly by the Ždírnický Stream. There is also half of the artificial Lake Milada in the territory of Chabařovice, which is a frequent tourist destination.

History
The first written mention of Chabařovice is from 1352. The name Chabařovice became established at the end of the 15th century. In 1520, Chabařovice was mentioned as a town with the rights to brew beer and produce malt.

Until the Germans were expelled after World War II, it was inhabited mainly by the German population, which made up two thirds of the population.

Coal was discovered around the town in 1774. Initially it helped the town's prosperity, but in the last quarter of the 20th century, the abolition of Chabařovice was planned for 1997 due to coal mining. In 1991, however, a government decision revoked this plan. In 1986, Chabařovice was joined to Ústí nad Labem, but in 1990, it became a separate town again.

Demographics

Transport
The D8 motorway runs next to the town.

Sights

The town's main landmark is the Church of the Nativity of the Virgin Mary. The original church was as old as the town. After it was severely damaged by a fire, the new church was built in 1699.

The old town hall is an architecturally interesting building from 1609, which divides both town's squares. Today it serves as a cultural and social centre, and houses the Chabařovice Town Museum.

Notable people
Emmy Loose (1914–1987), Austrian operatic singer
Ehrenfried Patzel (1914–2004), German-Czech footballer
Michael Lüftner (born 1994), footballer

Twin towns – sister cities

Chabařovice is twinned with:
 Drebach, Germany
 Ždiar, Slovakia

References

External links

Cities and towns in the Czech Republic
Populated places in Ústí nad Labem District